The Schorrsiegel Affair is a 1928 German silent film directed by Jaap Speyer that featured Bernhard Goetzke, Walter Rilla and Anita Dorris. It was shot at the Terra Studios in Berlin. The film's art direction was by Hans Jacoby.

Cast

References

Bibliography

External links

1928 films
Films of the Weimar Republic
German silent feature films
Films directed by Jaap Speyer
Films based on German novels
Terra Film films
German black-and-white films
Films shot at Terra Studios